Down Under (1975) is the 21st album by Bill Cosby.

It is his third compilation album containing favorites from his tenure with Warner Bros. Records.

Track listing

Side One
Baseball (from To Russell, My Brother, Whom I Slept With)
$75 Car (from Why Is There Air?)
Burlesque Shows (from It's True! It's True!)
Helicopters (from It's True! It's True!)
Niagara Falls (from Wonderfulness)

Side Two
Mothers And Fathers (from 200 M.P.H.)
The Wife (from 200 M.P.H.)
The Toothache (from Why Is There Air?)
The Losers (from To Russell, My Brother, Whom I Slept With)

Bill Cosby compilation albums
Spoken word albums by American artists
Live spoken word albums
1975 compilation albums
Warner Records compilation albums
1970s comedy albums